The Morris Mansion and Mill is located in Pemberton, Burlington County, New Jersey, United States. The building was added to the National Register of Historic Places on September 13, 1977.

See also
National Register of Historic Places listings in Burlington County, New Jersey

References

Houses on the National Register of Historic Places in New Jersey
Federal architecture in New Jersey
Houses in Burlington County, New Jersey
National Register of Historic Places in Burlington County, New Jersey
New Jersey Register of Historic Places
Pemberton, New Jersey